Petter Mørland Pedersen (born 7 June 1984) is a Norwegian sailor. He was born in Arendal. He came 4th whilst competing in two person keelboat (star) at the 2012 Summer Olympics in London.

References

Norwegian male sailors (sport)
1984 births
Living people
People from Arendal
Sailors at the 2012 Summer Olympics – Star
Olympic sailors of Norway
5.5 Metre class sailors
Sportspeople from Agder